Danja may refer to:

Danja (food), a variety of Korean rice cake
Danja (record producer), American record producer; real name Floyd Nathaniel Hills
Danja, Nigeria, a local government area in Katsina state

People with the given name
Danja Akulin (born 1977), Russian artist
Danja Haslacher, Austrian alpine skier
Danja Müsch (born 1971), German beach volleyball player

See also
Danjia (disambiguation)